The 1934 World Table Tennis Championships mixed doubles was the eighth edition of the mixed doubles championship. The Championships were held in December 1933 but are officially listed as the 1934 Championships.  

Miklós Szabados and Mária Mednyánszky defeated Viktor Barna and Anna Sipos in the final by three sets to one.

Results

See also
List of World Table Tennis Championships medalists

References

-